Count Otto Ottoson Vellingk (1649- 1708) was a Swedish general during the Great Northern War.

Biography
He was born in  Jama in Swedish Ingria to  Otto Gotthardsson Vellingk  and Christina Nilsdotter Mannersköld.

In 1664, Vellingk became a lieutenant with the Swedish regiment at Bremen. He subsequently entered French service in 1666 and was promoted in 1670 to Colonel in the French army. He was promoted to general in the Swedish  Army during 1698.  He participated in key battles of Great Northern War including: the Battle of Narva in 1700, and the Crossing of Daugava near Riga in 1701. He participated in the Battle of Klissow on 9 July 1702. He was in the Battle of Punitz on 28 October 1704.

He was made a royal advisor in 1705, and ennobled as a count in 1706.

See also
Great Northern War

References

External links
The Battle of Klezow (or Klissow) 9 July 1702

1649 births
1708 deaths
People from Kingisepp
Swedish counts
Swedish Army generals
17th-century Swedish military personnel
Swedish military personnel of the Great Northern War
Caroleans